Archie Brown (born 28 May 2002) is an English professional footballer who plays as a defender for Lausanne-Sport.

Career

As a youth player, Brown joined the youth academy of English side Derby County, helping them win their only youth top flight title. In 2021, he signed for Lausanne-Sport in Switzerland. On 28 November 2021, he debuted for Lausanne-Sport during a 0-3 loss to Servette.

References

External links
 

English footballers
Expatriate footballers in Switzerland
English expatriate sportspeople in Switzerland
FC Lausanne-Sport players
Swiss Super League players
Living people
Association football defenders
2002 births
English expatriate footballers
Swiss Challenge League players